Transcription factor 7-like 1, also known as TCF7L1, is a human gene.

This gene encodes a member of the T cell factor/lymphoid enhancer factor family of transcription factors. These transcription factors are activated by beta catenin, mediate the Wnt signaling pathway and are antagonized by the transforming growth factor beta signaling pathway. The encoded protein contains a high mobility group-box DNA binding domain and participates in the regulation of cell cycle genes and cellular senescence.

Model organisms	
			
Model organisms have been used in the study of TCF7L1 function. A conditional knockout mouse line, called Tcf7l1tm1a(EUCOMM)Wtsi was generated as part of the International Knockout Mouse Consortium program — a high-throughput mutagenesis project to generate and distribute animal models of disease to interested scientists.

Male and female animals underwent a standardized phenotypic screen to determine the effects of deletion. Twenty four tests were carried out on mutant mice and two significant abnormalities were observed. Few homozygous mutant embryos were identified during gestation, and those that did survive had a severe craniofacial defect. None survived until weaning. The remaining tests were carried out on heterozygous mutant adult mice; no additional significant abnormalities were observed in these animals.

References

Further reading 
 
 
 
 
 
 
 
 
 
 
 
 
 
 
 
 
 

Genes mutated in mice
Aging-related genes